East Mancos River is a  tributary of the Mancos River in Montezuma County, Colorado.   The river flows west from a source in the La Plata Mountains to a confluence with the West Mancos River that forms the Mancos River.

See also
List of rivers of Colorado
List of tributaries of the Colorado River

References

Rivers of Colorado
Rivers of Montezuma County, Colorado
Tributaries of the Colorado River in Colorado